This is a list of defunct airlines of Ethiopia.

See also
 List of airlines of Ethiopia
 List of airports in Ethiopia

References

Ethiopia
Airlines
Airlines, defunct